I Love Me may refer to:

 I Love Me (film), directed by B. Unnikrishnan

Songs 
 "I Love Me" (song), by Demi Lovato
 "I Love Me", by Lil' Mo, from the album P.S. I Love Me
 "I Love Me", by Meghan Trainor, from the album Thank You

See also
 I Love You (disambiguation)
 Narcissus (mythology)
Narcissism